Respiratory Research is an open access peer-reviewed medical journal published by BioMed Central. It covers all aspects of respiratory disease, including clinical and basic research. The journal publishes research articles, commentaries, letters to the editor, and reviews.

Abstracting and indexing 
The journal is abstracted and indexed in PubMed/MEDLINE, Chemical Abstracts Service, CAB International, Current Contents, and the Science Citation Index Expanded. According to the Journal Citation Reports, its 2016 impact factor is 3.841, ranking it 8th out of 50 journals in the category "Respiratory System".

References

External links 
 

Pulmonology journals
Publications established in 2000
BioMed Central academic journals
English-language journals
Creative Commons Attribution-licensed journals